Dinkarrav Shinde (born 2 June 1900, date of death 18th August 1962) was an Indian wrestler. He competed in the freestyle featherweight event at the 1920 Summer Olympics.

References

External links
 

1900 births
Year of death missing
Olympic wrestlers of India
Wrestlers at the 1920 Summer Olympics
Indian male sport wrestlers
Place of birth missing